Douwe or Douw is a Dutch given name of West Frisian origin and probably meaning "dove" (Frisian:dou). Notable people with the name include:

 Douwe Amels (born 1991), Dutch track and field athlete
 Douwe Aukes (1612–1668), Frisian sea captain of the Dutch East India Company
 Douwe Blumberg, Dutch sculptor
 Douwe Bob (born 1992), Dutch singer-songwriter
 Douwe Breimer (born 1943), Dutch pharmacologist
 Douwe Juwes de Dowe (1608–1662), Dutch Golden Age painter
 Douwe Eisenga (born 1961), Dutch composer
 Douwe Korff (born 1951), Dutch professor of international law at London Metropolitan University
 Douwe Sirtema van Grovestins (1710–1778), Frisian courtier at the court of stadtholder William IV
 Douw Steyn (born 1952), South African billionaire businessman
 Douwe de Vries (born 1982), Dutch marathon and long track speed skater

See also
Douwe Egberts, coffee brand named after Douwe Egberts de Jong (1755–1806), Frisian-Dutch merchant and coffee roaster

References

Dutch masculine given names